The Hawke's Bay Guineas is a major Thoroughbred horse race in New Zealand for three-year-old horses. In 2003 the stake was boosted to $100,000 and the race was moved to the first Saturday in October, meaning that it is run on the same day as the Spring Classic. In later years it has been on the same day as the Windsor Park Plate.

Notable winners

The race is an excellent guide to the New Zealand 2000 Guineas, and in recent years has been won by horses that have gone on to perform well in major races in Australia - particularly:
 Alamosa, the 2008 Toorak Handicap winner. 
 Balmerino
 Darci Brahma, the winner of the 2005 T.J. Smith Stakes
 Jimmy Choux, the 2011 Rosehill Guineas winner and 2011 Cox Plate runner-up
 Mr Tiz, winner of the 1989-1991 Railway Stakes, 1989 & 1990 Telegraph Handicap, 1991 Waikato Sprint and 1991 The Galaxy
 Sacred Falls, the winner of the 2013 and 2014 Doncaster Handicap and 2014 George Main Stakes
 Turn Me Loose, winner of the 2015 Seymour Cup, Crystal Mile & Emirates Stakes and the 2016 Futurity Stakes
 Veandercross, winner of the 1993 Ranvet Stakes and Australian Cup

In 2005, the race was run in the national record time for 1400 metres of 1:19.97 as Darci Brahma and Dr Green fought out the finish.

Race results

•• The distance changed from 1600m to 1400m in 1987

See also
 Thoroughbred racing in New Zealand
 New Zealand Derby
 New Zealand 1000 Guineas
 New Zealand 2000 Guineas
 Levin Classic

References

Horse races in New Zealand